Herbert MacKay-Fraser (June 23, 1922 – July 14, 1957) was a racing driver from the United States, born in Recife Pernambuco, Brazil.  He participated in one Formula One World Championship grand prix, the 1957 French Grand Prix, on July 7, 1957.  He retired from the race and scored no championship points.  A week later he was killed in the Coupe de Vitesse at Reims-Gueux, when he crashed his Lotus.

Complete Formula One World Championship results
(key)

References

1922 births
1957 deaths
American Formula One drivers
Racing drivers who died while racing
Sport deaths in France
24 Hours of Le Mans drivers
BRM Formula One drivers
People from Pernambuco
World Sportscar Championship drivers